Michael De Feo (born July 21, 1972) is an American artist based in New York City. He is best known for his floral paintings and street art which deal with themes of ephemerality, growth, the cycle of life and the coupling of beauty with the universality of death. De Feo's penchant for flowers have earned him the nickname, "The Flower Guy."

His work shows a wide range of influences, including Dutch 17th century still life painting, fashion magazines, and fashion advertising campaigns. He often adds his floral treatments and cascades of multicolored petals to existing printed images from the fashion world and art history/traditional art, which both subverts and celebrates the underlying image. "De Feo's work," Wonderland magazine has written, "contains all the necessary components to make it well and truly groundbreaking."

Career 
Since 1992, De Feo has been creating works on the streets in over 60 cities across the world, including New York, Los Angeles, Miami, Paris, Amsterdam, Venice, London, Cabo San Lucas, Buenos Aires and Hong Kong. De Feo is best known in the street art movement for his iconic illustration of a flower.

The first large flower he painted in 1994 was on East 23rd Street, between Second and Third Avenues.

In 2004, Gingko Press published De Feo's first book, Alphabet City: Out on the Streets.

In 2019, Abrams Books published Michael De Feo: Flowers, a monograph celebrating and documenting 25 years of De Feo's use of flowers from his street art to his studio paintings.

Notable exhibitions 
De Feo's work has been featured in a numerous international galleries and museums, notably at the New Museum in New York in 2003; the Aldrich Museum in Ridgefield, Connecticut in 2005; Manifesta 7 in Trento, Italy in 2008; the Underbelly Project in New York in 2010; and Jonathan LeVine's 10 years of Wooster Collective show in 2013, for which De Feo exhibited several flower paintings along with his manhole cover sculpture; Bleecker Street Arts Club in 2014; a solo exhibition at Danziger Gallery in New York in 2015; a solo exhibition at The Garage in Amsterdam in 2015; a site-specific installation at the Rice Gallery in Houston in 2016; and a School of Visual Arts alumni exhibition at the School of Visual Arts Chelsea Gallery in 2017.

Collaborations 
De Feo has collaborated with multiple fashion brands.

In 2017, De Feo designed a line of shirts for J. Crew. The brand first recognized De Feo when he painted his signature cascade of flowers over one of their bus advertisements in the spring of 2015. His art was also used in the windows of J.Crew stores worldwide.

He has also done work with Milly, Neiman Marcus, and Christian Louboutin.

Philanthropy 
De Feo has contributed his work to various benefit auctions and non-profit organizations, such as Free Arts and the Children's Museum of New York. Russel Simmon's philanthropy, Rush Philanthropic, chose De Feo as their featured artist of the year in 2014.

De Feo has been working with the High Line in New York since prior to its groundbreaking in 2006. In September 2016, De Feo designed signage, posters, and various artwork to celebrate the Chelsea Grasslands for the Friends of the High Line in New York.

Exhibitions

Selected solo exhibitions 
 2016 Danziger Gallery, Michael De Feo, New York, NY, July 13 – August 12 
 2016 Rice Gallery, Rice University, Crosstown Traffic, Houston, Texas, June 9 –     August 28 
 2016 The Garage, The Fashion Pages, Amsterdam, the Netherlands, April 8–29 
 2014 Rush Arts Gallery, A Pocket Full of Posies, New York, NY, September 4–20
 2011 Orange Dot Gallery, London, UK, Coming in from the Outside, March 8–15
 2010 A’P’art: Le festival international d’art contemporain, Alpilles-Provence, France, July 8 – 13
 2010 No Borders Contemporary Art, Hong Kong, China, Mining for Splinters and Diamonds, June 24 – Aug.14
 2009 Hollywood in Cambodia, Buenos Aires, Argentina, New Self-Portraits, April 21
 2008 The Editions/Artists’ Book Fair, New York, NY, Aldrich Edition, Aldrich Contemporary Art Museum, Oct. 31 – Nov. 2
 2008 Museo de Arte de Puerto Rico, Santurce, San Juan, Puerto Rico, Flowers (interior and exterior installations), Ongoing
 2008 Manifesta 7, Trento, Italy, Flowers (outdoor installation on the Palazzina Liberty), June 21 – Nov. 2
 2008 Another Space, Amsterdam, the Netherlands, Another Show, April 18 – 19
 2007 OPEN SPACE Gallery, Beacon, NY, Inside Out, September 8 – Nov. 4
 2007 Association le M.U.R., Paris, France, Olympia – Hommage au Manet (outdoor billboard painting installation), July 28 – Aug. 11
 2007 A3 Art Fair, Paris, France, Michael De Feo: Drawings and Paintings, June 25–26
 2005 Aldrich Contemporary Art Museum, Ridgefield, CT, Two Atmospheres (outdoor installation)
 2005 Colette, Paris, France, Alphabet City (exterior installation and book launch)
 2005 The New Museum Store, New Museum of Contemporary Art, New York, NY, Alphabet City (indoor installation and book launch)
 2003 90 Square Meters, Amsterdam, the Netherlands, Michael De Feo
 2001 Halcyon, Brooklyn, NY, Michael De Feo
 1994 The Tunnel, New York, NY, Maskarave III, Flowers
 1994 The Rye Free Reading Room, Rye, NY, Michael De Feo

Selected group exhibitions 
 2017 Danziger Gallery at Pulse Art Fair, Miami, FL, Dec. 7 - 10
 2017 School of Visual Arts Chelsea Gallery, New York, NY, Street Smart: The Intersection of Art and Design in the City, Nov. 18  - Dec. 20
 2016 Danziger Gallery at Pulse Art Fair, Miami, FL, Dec. 1 - 4
 2014 A’P’art: Le festival international d’art contemporain, Alpilles-Provence, France, July 4 – Aug. 31
 2014 Bleecker Street Arts Club, New York, NY, April 24 – May 24
 2013 Jonathan LeVine Gallery, New York, NY,10 Years of Wooster Collective: 2003–2013, curators Sara & Marc Schiller, Aug. 7 – 24
 2013 Bridgette Mayer Gallery, Philadelphia, PA, Benefit Exhibition for BalletX, July 9 – Aug. 9
 2013 Stolenspace Gallery, London, UK, VII, July 7 – 28
 2012 Bibliothèque Toulouse, Toulouse, France, Cit’Imagine... une ville, Nov. 16, 2012 – Feb. 24, 2013
 2011 Art Basel Miami Beach, Miami, FL, The Underbelly Show, Dec. 2 - 5
 2011 Samuel Owen Gallery, Greenwich, CT, On Every Street, curated by Michael De Feo, Oct. 6 – Nov. 4
 2010 Nina Sagt Galerie, Düsseldorf, Germany, Bembe: Dave The Chimp, Nov. 27 – Dec. 24
 2010 Espace Blancs Manteaux, Paris, France, Le M.U.R. De L’Art, Oct. 28 – Nov. 1
 2010 Aldrich Contemporary Art Museum, Ridgefield, CT, Gary Lichtenstein: 35 Years of Screenprinting, June 27, 2010 – Jan. 2, 2011 
 2009 Angell Gallery, Toronto, Ontario, Canada, Angell Group Show, Nov. 28, 2009 – Jan. 2, 2010
 2009 Visual Arts Gallery, New York, NY, The Wilde Years: 40 Years of Shaping Visual Culture, Oct. 9 – Nov. 7
 2009 Thinkspace Gallery, Los Angeles, CA, “The Streets of Brooklyn”, curated by Ad Hoc Art, Jan. 9 – Feb. 6
 2008 Anonymous Gallery, The Piece Process (group exhibit), Dec. 17 – Jan. 24
 2008 James Turrell/Baker Pool, Greenwich, CT, Special Access Tour, September
 2008 Missouri State Penitentiary, Jefferson City, MO, Art Inside the Park (outdoor installation), Oct. 2008 - 2009
 2008 Galerie L.J. Beaubourg, Paris, France, Le M.U.R., curated by Jean Faucheur, June 12 - July 1
 2007 Ad Hoc Gallery, Brooklyn, NY, Behind the Seen, Dec. 13 – Jan. 20, curated by Michael De Feo
 2006 Candle Building, New York, NY, Wooster on Spring
 2006 Neuberger Museum, Purchase, NY, Snackshop 5000: The Vending Machine Show
 2006 National Gallery, Dhaka, Bangladesh, 35th Independence Day Art Festival
 2006 Stay Gold Gallery, Brooklyn, NY, Open Air
 2006 Iron Studios, Chicago, IL, Version > 06: Urban Gardening and Exterior Decorating
 2004 Wooster Arts Space, New York, NY, Hollywood: The Remix
 2004 Massachusetts Museum of Contemporary Art, North Adams, MA, The Interventionists: Art in the Social Sphere
 2003 New Museum of Contemporary Art, New York, NY, (installation for I [heart] NY)
 2003 Die Registratur, Munich, Germany, The Art of Rebellion
 2003 Kunstraum Kruezberg/Bethanien, Berlin, Germany, Backjumps: The Live Issue
 2002 Artists Space, New York, NY, Repellent Magazine

Media attention

Online and print 
 New York Magazine 
 The New York Times
 Vogue
 WWD
 Metal Magazine
 Paper Magazine
 New York Observer
 i-D
 InStyle
 The Globe and Mail
 Wonderland Magazine

Film, TV and radio  
 1995 Breakfast Time, FX (live national cable program), July 13
 2006 To Be Seen, produced by Alice Arnold, First Run Icarus Films, screened on PBS/WLIW & The Museum of Modern Art
 2007 Concrete Canvas, Electric Sky Productions for gallery HD (Vroom Networks), UK 
 2009 MTV Brazil, “The Flower Guy”
 2010 Banksy's Exit Through the Gift Shop
 2014 Rush Philanthropic Arts Foundation, New York, “A Pocket Full of Posies”, September 4
 2016 “Michael De Feo: Crosstown Traffic” by Walley Films for Rice Gallery, Rice University, Houston, Texas

Awards 
 2016 Clio Award, Fashion & Beauty, Bronze for Neiman Marcus The Book series, both covers of April Issue
 2010 D&D Award, Wood Pencil, Magazine & Newspaper Design, Magazine Front Cover, Best of the Year for Cover of New York Magazine's "Reasons to Love New York" Issue
 2006 Certificate of Design Excellence for the Cover of New York Magazine's Double End of the Year Issue, "Reasons to Love New York Right Now," Print Magazine Regional Design Annual, November/December
 2005 Radius Award, Aldrich Contemporary Art Museum, Ridgefield, CT
 2005 Certificate of Design Excellence for "Alphabet City: Out On The Streets," Print Magazine Regional Design Annual, November

References

External links
 Michael De Feo's website

Living people
Artists from New York City
1972 births